Toon Disney was an American multinational pay television channel owned by Disney Channels Worldwide, a subsidiary of Disney-ABC Television Group. The channel's target audience was children ages 7-11, and children ages 6–13 during the Jetix programming block.

A spin-off of Disney Channel, the channel's programming mostly included animated series, shorts and features from Disney, as well as acquired programs.

History
Toon Disney was launched on April 18, 1998 at 3:00 p.m. Eastern Time, in honor of Disney Channel's 15th anniversary by Disney/ABC Networks on digital tiers of DirecTV, Marcus Cable and EchoStar. The first program to air on the network was The Sorcerer's Apprentice (1940). At 7:00 p.m. ET that day, Toon Disney launched a block called "The Magical World of Toons". The block originally featured Disney animated features, specials and shorts. Over the next five months, Toon Disney furthered its programming to cable subscribers such as Americast. At its launch, the channel shared half of its assigned series with Disney Channel. The channel had no advertising until its viewership reached a set number. On January 31, 1999, the first annual Pumbaa Bowl marathon was broadcast.

By September 2000, the channel was expected to reach 20 million subscribers, and thus, would start showing advertising. Ad sales would be handled by Disney Kids Network.

In June 2001, Toon Disney launched the "Most Animated Kid Search". The Santa Claus Brothers had its world premiere on the channel in December. In September 2002, eight new shows joined the line-up as part of Toon Disney's fall schedule. In commemoration of the network's fifth anniversary in April 2003, the channel held the "Toon Disney's Magical Adventure Sweepstakes" in which three winners along with 3 family members would win a trip to Disneyland Resort to see Disney's Aladdin: A Musical Spectacular.

On February 14, 2004, the Jetix programming block began on Toon Disney and ABC Family as a part of the Jetix programming alliance of ABC Networks Group, Fox Kids Europe and Fox Kids Latin America. The block consisted of the entire acquired Fox Kids/Saban Entertainment action library as the result of a bulk buy-out by The Walt Disney Company in summer 2001, as well as some original programming. Some shows, like The Legend of Tarzan, and Buzz Lightyear of Star Command aired under both the Toon Disney and Jetix monikers.

The Toon Disney/Big Movie Show premiere of The Polar Express on December 22, 2006, was the channel's highest primetime rating with 1.35 million viewers. On January 27, 2007, Toon Disney launched its weekend afternoon programming block called "The Great Toon Weekend."

On August 6, 2008, Disney-ABC Television Group announced they would rebrand Toon Disney in early 2009 as Disney XD, which would be aimed at kids from ages 6 and up. The final pre-Disney XD program to air on the channel was The Incredible Hulk episode "Doomed" at 11:30 p.m. ET on Thursday, February 12, 2009, as part of Jetix, while the first Disney XD program was the Phineas and Ferb episode "Dude, We're Getting the Band Back Together" on Friday, February 13, 2009 at 12:00 a.m. ET.

Programming

Blocks
Toon Disney's Big Movie Show is an evening movie block started in 2005 and lasted until 2009. 
Double Feature Friday was a block that featured two different movies back-to-back every Friday night. The block started in 2001 and lasted until 2004.
Jetix was a block using programming from the Saban/Marvel library held by ABC Family Worldwide and additional original programming launched on February 14, 2004, with the block originally having 12 hours of weekly prime time programming to start. By the time Toon Disney dissolved in February 2009, Jetix had taken up more than half of the network's programming schedule, airing for 12 hours on weekdays and 19 hours on weekends.
 The Magical World of Toons was Toon Disney's prime time block which was launched on April 18, 1998 and lasted until 2003. During the week, the block would showcase shorts and series featuring Disney characters such as Mickey Mouse, Donald Duck, Timon & Pumbaa, Hercules, Aladdin, Doug and Pepper Ann. During the weekend, the block would present animated features, most of those created for the home video market, like The Return of Jafar and The Brave Little Toaster Goes to Mars, as well as some theatrical releases including A Goofy Movie, Alice in Wonderland and The Brave Little Toaster.
Princess Power Hour was a block featuring Disney Princesses Jasmine and Ariel through episodes of Aladdin and The Little Mermaid. (2000–2007) 
Chillin' With the Villains was a block that aired on Sundays. The block consists of a mini-marathon of a series which featured a notable villain. (2000–2004)
The Great Toon Weekend (GTW) was a weekend afternoon programming block that aired every Saturday and Sunday starting at noon for 7 hours beginning on January 27, 2007. The Great Toon Weekend started with a two-hour movie under the banner of "Big Movie Show" followed by five hours of back-to-back episodes of the following shows: Aladdin, Timon & Pumbaa, Buzz Lightyear of Star Command, The Emperor's New School and Lilo & Stitch.
Hangin' with the Heroes began in January 2002 as a weekend block consisting of two hours of Aladdin, Gargoyles, and Hercules. Later, the block began airing every weeknight starting at 11:00 pm.

International versions
In the Fall of 2000, Disney launched its first overseas Toon Disney channel in the United Kingdom. The UK channel was later replaced by Disney Cinemagic in March 2006. In 2004, 4 new markets added a Toon Disney channel with three in Europe with Germany also adding a time shift channel. In December, Walt Disney Television International India launched a Toon Disney channel with three language audio tracks (English, Tamil and Telugu). In 2005, a Toon Disney channel was launched for the Nordic countries, as well as another one for Japan. A Hindi-language audio track was introduced on Toon Disney in India on September 1, 2005. After the shutdown of the US channel, the remaining channels & blocks with the Toon Disney name outside the US were relaunched as either Disney Cinemagic (in European countries only), Disney Channel, or Disney XD, with the last Toon Disney-branded channels to close being the 2 Italy channels on October 1, 2011.

See also
 List of programs broadcast by Toon Disney

References

External links
  - includes the Launch program for Toon Disney which has the first week's programming guide

Disney Channel
Toon Disney original programming
Jetix original programming
Disney XD
Disney television networks
Children's television networks in the United States
Defunct television networks in the United States
English-language television stations in the United States
Television channels and stations established in 1998
Television channels and stations disestablished in 2009